Giannina Ruffinelli Rojas (born 1987) is a Paraguayan model and beauty pageant titleholder who represented Paraguay in the Miss Universe 2008 pageant held in the Diamond Bay Resort, Nha Trang, Vietnam on July 14, 2008, but she did not get a place.

References

1987 births
Paraguayan people of Italian descent
Miss Universe 2008 contestants
Paraguayan female models
Living people
Paraguayan beauty pageant winners